Mário Emílio de Morais Sacramento (July 7, 1920 – March 27, 1969) was a Portuguese physician and essayist that became famous for his antifascist activities against the dictatorial regime led by Oliveira Salazar in Portugal.

Mário Sacramento was born in Ílhavo, Aveiro District and studied medicine in Coimbra, Lisbon, Porto and finally graduated in Paris. He started his writing activity very soon and became a regular contributor to several newspapers and magazines, such as "O Diabo" (The Devil), "Sol Nascente" (Rising Sun), "Vértice" (vertex) or the "Diário de Lisboa" (Lisbon Daily).

Sacramento also published several essays about Eça de Queiroz, Moniz Barreto, Cesário Verde, Fernando Namora or Fernando Pessoa, that made him become a respected person among the Portuguese intellectuals.

Due to his intellectual activities and Anti-fascist and democratic feelings, Sacramento soon developed connections to the Portuguese Communist Party, at the time, the only organized resistance movement against the dictatorship. Because of that he became a member of the Central Commission of the youth wing of the Movement of Democratic Unity (Portuguese: Movimento de Unidade Democrática - Juvenil or MUD), the only opposition movement "allowed" by the regime, that congregated almost all those who were against the dictatorship. There, he developed his political activities and became famous among the democratic resistance. He was one of the main organizers of the 1st and 2nd Republican Congresses in Aveiro, congresses that in a somewhat secret way, set important guidelines to the anti-fascist struggle, and was honored in the 3rd, that was only carried out after his death.

Sacramento was arrested a total of five times by the political police, the PIDE. The first time was in 1938, when he was a member of the students union in a high school in Aveiro.

Nowadays, Mário Sacramento is one of the most well-known persons of Aveiro, and his name is present in several places like schools, streets and avenues.

---

«Mário Sacramento, La vie et l'Oeuvre», These de Doctorat, Sorbonne, DEC. 2002» [doctors degree thesis, in Sorbonne] by Eunice de Almeida Malaquias Vouillot :

Mário Sacramento, a Neo-Realism Portuguese writer, his life and work, is a two-volumes biography, divided into four parts. The first three parts relate the essayist's life, who was born in Ilhavo, on July 7, 1920, and who died on March 27, 1969, in Porto. His fondness for literature was revealed when he was a teenager. His struggle for social justice under the «Estado Novo» repressive regime led him five times to prison, between 1938 and 1962. He ended his medical studies in 1946 at Lisbon University where he had participated to the «MUD Juvenil» Central Commission. He organized the First Republican Congress in 1957. In 1961, he graduated in gastroenterology, in Paris. He took part in many political and literary demonstrations, and in two conferences on childhood. His first essay, Eça de Queirós, uma Estética da Ironia (1945) was awarded the Oliveira Martins prize. Other essays such as Fernando Pessoa, Poeta da Hora Absurda (1959), Fernando Namora, a Obra e o Homem (1967), Há uma Estética Neo-Realista? (1968) have punctuated his life. We have gathered according to themes his three prefaces and his articles gathered within the three books Ensaios de Domingo (1959,1974, 1990) which raised him to the rank of Neo-Realism theorist, as well as articles about his dialogue with Catholics (1967-1969) where he affirms his humanistic convictions and open-mindedness in Frátria, Diálogo com os Católicos (1971). 
	The fourth part presents the essayist's personal creation in the form of a DIARY (1975) written between 1967 and 1969, where he recollects his life, five plays, poems, moral tales and unpublished stories. The second volume contains appendixes.

1920 births
1969 deaths
People from Ílhavo
Portuguese male writers
Portuguese Communist Party politicians
Portuguese anti-fascists
University of Paris alumni
20th-century Portuguese writers